Da 2nd Phaze is the second album by English grime MC Wiley. It was released on 1 July 2006 by Boy Better Know after his departure from XL Recordings. The tracks "Eskiboy", "Gangsterz", and "Johnny Was A Badboy" were released again on Wiley's third album Playtime Is Over in 2007.

Track listing 

2006 albums
Wiley (musician) albums